Ablaberoides testaceipennis are a species of beetles discovered in 1924. No subspecies are listed on Catalogue of Life.

References 

Melolonthinae